James O'Connor may refer to:

Politics and law
 James O'Connor (Louisiana politician) (1870–1941), U.S Representative from Louisiana
 James F. O'Connor (1878–1945), U.S Representative from Montana
 James Francis Thaddeus O'Connor (1886–1949), U.S. federal judge 
 James O'Connor (Cork politician) (born 1997), Irish Fianna Fáil politician for Cork East
 James O'Connor (Wicklow politician) (1836–1910), MP for the constituency of West Wicklow 1892–1910
 James O'Connor (Irish judge) (1872–1931), Attorney General for Ireland 
 James L. O'Connor (1858–1931), Wisconsin Attorney General
 James O'Connor (Arizona politician) (born 1946), American politician
 James K. O'Connor (1864–?), American politician

Sports
 James O'Connor (footballer, born 1979), former Irish soccer player, former head coach of Orlando City SC
 James O'Connor (footballer, born 1984), English football player for Kidderminster Harriers
 James O'Connor (rugby union) (born 1990), Australian rugby union player
 Jamesie O'Connor (born 1972), Irish hurler

Other
 James Arthur O'Connor (1792–1841), Irish painter
 James O'Connor (bishop) (1823–1890), Irish-American Roman Catholic bishop of Omaha
 James F. O'Conner (1861–1940), United States Navy sailor and Medal of Honor recipient
 James O'Connor (academic) (1930–2017), American sociologist and economist
 James O'Connor (drummer), American drummer with the band Godhead

See also 
 Jimmy O'Connor, Irish footballer
 Jimmy O'Connor (author) (1918–2001), journalist and television dramatist
 Connor (disambiguation)